Debatable Land   is a Guardian Fiction Prize-winning novel by Scottish author Candia McWilliam. The novel seeks to raise questions about the direction in which Britain (and more specifically the devolution project) is moving in the 21st century. The title refers to the debatable lands, land lying between Scotland and England when they were distinct kingdoms which perennially switched between English and Scots rule, before becoming an independent lawless territory ruled by warring clans. Set on a boat on the beautifully evoked South Pacific, the relations between the characters mirror contemporary devolutionary debates between the constitutive British states, particularly the relationship between England and Scotland.

1994 British novels
Novels set in Oceania
Home rule in the United Kingdom
Guardian Fiction Prize-winning works
Bloomsbury Publishing books